Mamma (also released as Our Life Is Now) is a 1982 Swedish drama film directed by Suzanne Osten. Malin Ek won the award for Best Actress at the 19th Guldbagge Awards.

Cast
 Malin Ek as Gerd
 Birgit Cullberg as Gerd som gammal
 Ida-Lotta Backman as Steffin Porquettas
 Iwa Boman as Barbro
 Hans V. Engström as Jan
 Kerstin Eriksson as Armélotta

References

External links
 
 

1982 films
1982 drama films
Swedish drama films
1980s Swedish-language films
Films directed by Suzanne Osten
1980s Swedish films